The Gyalwang Drukpa is the honorific title of the head of the Drukpa Lineage, one of the independent Sarma (new) schools of Vajrayana Buddhism. This lineage of reincarnated masters started from Tsangpa Gyare, the first Gyalwang Drukpa and founder of the school. The 12th Gyalwang Drukpa, Jigme Pema Wangchen, is the current lineage holder. He was born at Lake Rewalsar, India in 1963.

Spiritual origin

The Drukpa Lineage of Tibetan Buddhism traces its origin back to Vajradhara, the primordial Buddha. Its early founders include Tilopa, Naropa, Marpa Lotsawa, Milarepa, Gampopa, Rechung Dorje Drakpa, Phagmo Drupa Dorje Gyalpo and Lingchen Repa. Lingchen Repa was the guru of the first Gyalwang Drukpa, Tsangpa Gyare.

Tsangpa Gyare was recognized as the Bodhisattva of Great Compassion Avalokiteśvara in human form, as well as an incarnation of the first Buddhist King of Tibet, Songtsän Gampo, of the great saint Naropa and of Milarepa's sun-like disciple Gampopa. The Drukpa Lineage spread throughout Nepal, Tibet, Ladakh, North India and Bhutan.

Following the death of the Fourth Gyalwang Drukpa, Kunkhyen Pema Karpo, there were two reincarnations, as he prophesied. One, Pagsam Wangpo, remained in Central Tibet with the patronage of the King of Tsang.  The other, Ngawang Namgyal, 1st Zhabdrung Rinpoche, went to Bhutan, where the Drukpa Lineage today is now the official religious order of the state. Ever since Ngawang Namgyal appointed Pekar Jungne as the first Je Khenpo, the spiritual head of all monasteries in Bhutan, the successive Je Khenpos have acted as the Spiritual Regents of Bhutan.

Indian Government issued commemorative stamp in the name of the "Drukpa lineage"

On 14 May 2014, Department of Posts-Government of India celebrated Buddha Purnima with the release of a commemorative stamp on the Drukpa Buddhists, a rare and perhaps first recognition given by the Indian government to a particular Buddhist lineage.

The commemorative stamp celebrating the 999 years of Drukpa Lineage was released by Shri SK Sinha, Member (HRD), Department of Posts in the presence of the Gyalwang Drukpa, spiritual head of Drukpa Buddhists, Drukpa Thuksey Rinpoche, a spiritual regent of the lineage, as well as diplomats representing various countries, ministers and followers of the Drukpa Lineage, at Ashok Hotel in Delhi.

Present Gyalwang Drukpa and activities
 The Gyalwang Drukpa was born at Rewalsar, India in 1963. He is an active environmentalist, educator and the spiritual head of the Drukpa Lineage, one of the main Buddhist schools of the Himalayas founded by the great Indian saint Naropa (1016–1100CE) with a thousand-year legacy in India. He applies ancient Buddhist philosophy to resolve today's problems and has millions of followers worldwide.

One of the Gyalwang Drukpa's main focuses is on environmental preservation and education, which puts into action the core Buddhist principle that all beings are interconnected and interdependent. His mission is to promote universal harmony and inner peace by integrating the spiritual tenets of love and appreciation into daily life. His work also includes encouraging gender equality, establishing educational institutions, medical clinics and meditation centres and rebuilding heritage sites in the Himalayas. He is the founder and spiritual director of the award-winning Druk White Lotus School in Ladakh, India, which provides its students with a modern education while preserving their local culture.

 He teaches that everyone can have a dramatic positive impact on the community around them, and teaches that we should put compassion into action. In recognition of his activism, the Gyalwang Drukpa received the United Nations Millennium Development Goals (MDG) Honour in September 2010 and three months later in December 2010, he received Green Hero Award, presented by the President of India.

Historically, women in the Himalayas have struggled to receive equal treatment, sometimes being ostracised for seeking to practise spirituality. The Gyalwang Drukpa is working to change this and has established the Druk Gawa Khilwa Nunnery – a modern and green abbey outside Kathmandu, Nepal with a satellite abbey in Ladakh, India. There, women receive a modern education, as well as spiritual training historically reserved for men. In an effort to instill self-confidence, the Gyalwang Drukpa has also authorized them to learn kung fu, training that was off-limits to women for over two centuries. These kung fu nuns are gaining worldwide recognition. They have organized bi-annual cycling trips that the Gyalwang Drupka joins A BBC News documentary featured them. In addition, they have performed at the Olympic Park in London and at the CERN in Geneva.

The Gyalwang Drukpa regularly addresses the international community on contemporary issues including environmental protection, gender equality and religious tolerance. He attends the annual United Nations week in New York, where he speaks at different UN Women's forums meeting with like-minded women leaders such as Cherie Blair, Geena Davis and Her Royal Highness Princess Basmah bint Saud, attends high-level meetings concerning world conflicts, and participates at various discussions on climate change.

The Gyalwang Drukpa also collaborates with well-respected international organizations to promote the message of active compassion as well as to find effective and sustainable solutions to bridge materialism and spirituality. Most recently, the Gyalwang Drukpa visited the CERN in Switzerland with several of his kung fu nuns to discuss the seeming tension of religion and science in society, as well as the improvement of gender equality. He often meets with several United Nations branches, including the World Health Organization, to discuss, among other things, potential cooperation in improving health worldwide.

Live to Love
In his effort to use Buddhist approaches to solve modern day problems, the Gyalwang Drukpa founded the Live to Love global humanitarian movement in 2007. Live to Love is an international consortium of secular, non-profit organizations working together to achieve five aims: Education, Environmental Protection, Medical Services, Relief Aid and Heritage Preservation.

Beyond its formal aims, Live to Love hopes to inspire others to integrate acts of love – big and small – into their daily lives.

Environmental protection
The Himalayan region, known as the ‘third pole’ supplies water to nearly one-half of the world's population and is disproportionately impacted by global warming. Live to Love sponsors several unique and world-renowned projects focused on environmental protection of this fragile eco-system. For example, every year, Live to Love hosts the ‘Eco Pad Yatra,’ (‘Pad’ means ‘foot’ and ‘Yatra’ means journing, ‘Pad Yatra’ means ‘journey on foot’) a trek in which hundreds of volunteers hike hundreds of miles collecting plastic waste. Live to Love also plants literally tens of thousands of trees in the region, cleaning the air of toxins and stabilizing the soil. In September 2013, during the UN week, the Gyalwang Drukpa was named ‘The Guardian of the Himalayas’ by Waterkeeper Alliance, founded in 1999 by environmental lawyer Robert F. Kennedy Jr. and several Waterkeeper organisations.

In 2010, the Gyalwang Drukpa launched an initiative to plant one million trees in Ladakh, as part of the ‘one million trees’ campaign initiated by Wangari Maathaï, recipient of the Nobel Peace Prize in 2004. As part of this initiative, the Gyalwang Drukpa led the Live to Love volunteers to break the Guinness World Record twice for most trees planted simultaneously. In October 2012, over 9,800 volunteers planted nearly 100,000 trees, safeguarding villages from mudslides and cleaning polluted air.

Education
The people of Ladakh, India, preserve a unique Buddhist lifestyle. As modernization occurs, they are losing their indigenous culture and are having difficulty competing in the new economy. With approximately 1,000 students, the Druk White Lotus School seeks to provide its students a modern education while instilling a respect for the unique indigenous culture of this region. This curriculum includes courses in English and computer skills, as well as the local language and art. The school has won multiple accolades for its sustainable design including three World Architecture Awards and the Inspiring Design Award from the British Council for School Environments. The school has been the subject of an acclaimed PBS documentary (USA), narrated by Brad Pitt, and has been featured in the Bollywood blockbuster film, ‘3 Idiots’ starring Aamir Khan.

Medical services
Many remote Himalayan communities lack basic medical services. The Druk White Lotus Clinic, recently opened and operational, is located on Druk Amitabha Mountain outside of Kathmandu, Nepal, and provides regular medical care for the community living on the mountain. At the guidance of the Gyalwang Drukpa Live to Love also hosts temporary medical clinics in Ladakh, India, including an annual eye clinic in which doctors replace the corneas of individuals who have lost sight due to eye disease. After a relatively simple surgery, patients who were blind can see. Further, Live to Love seeks to train amchis, practitioners of traditional Himalayan medicine, to provide basic medical care to very remote communities and liaise with allopathic doctors to treat more serious illnesses.

Relief aid
In August 2010, a flash flood from an unexpected cloudburst devastated Ladakh, killing hundreds and leaving thousands homeless. The Gyalwang Drukpa's Live to Love international and domestic volunteers distributed necessities to those in need. They provided nearly 300 units of LPG gas tanks and cooking stoves to displaced families to replace more dangerous portable kerosene stoves. The Druk White Lotus School took in children left homeless because of the flash flood. In light of this disaster, Live to Love seeks to train local Himalayan volunteers in disaster relief expertise in the coming years to provide a rapid, formal response to future events. The Gyalwang Drukpa himself visited, on foot, 50 remote villages affected by the flash flood.

Heritage preservation
The culture and art of Ladakh, India is primarily Buddhist. Because Ladakh is located along the Silk Route, many locations present rare examples of Gandhara and Bamiyan style Buddhist art, which synthesizes Byzantine, Roman-Greco, Scytho-Parthian and Indian elements. Most examples of this style of art have been destroyed in Afghanistan and Pakistan. At the instruction of the Gyalwang Drukpa, Live to Love seeks to preserve this unique art. In addition, Live to Love is beginning an initiative to digitally archive blockprints, manuscripts and texts found in community buildings and homes that reflect and chronicle the culture and history of Ladakh.

List of successive Gyalwang Drukpas

Forced conversion of Drukpa monasteries in Mount Kailash by Chinese-led Karma Kagyu
On 10 September 2014, the Gyalwang Drukpa issued an official statement accusing Beijing of fanning intra-sect rivalries by using the Chinese-led subset-under-occupation of the Karma Kagyu to forcibly take over Drukpa monasteries in the holy Mount Kailash area of Tibet, with Drukpa monks and yogis being forced out of their monasteries, and photographs of Drukpa masters replaced with photographs of the (Chinese-recognized) Karmapa, Ogyen Trinley Dorje. The Gyalwang Drukpa stated, “They are using (the Karmapa's) name, but I don’t think he is responsible."

The office of Karmapa Ogyen Trinley Dorje quickly replied, saying, “His Holiness does not believe in (forced) conversion. He has a broad outlook, and there is no conversion plan. He believes in harmony and dialogue between all sects, and we all belong to the broad Buddhist tradition.” Spokesperson Kunzang Chunvyalp added that the Karmapa has urged that Drukpa monasteries which have been desecrated "be restored because they are very sacred."

Tirthapuri and Drira Phug are the two most prominent heritages having been forcibly taken over. While the Gyalwang Drukpa has only mentioned two Drukpa monasteries in Kailash that have been forcibly converted to the Chinese version of the Karma Kagyu, the office of Karmapa Ogyen Trinley Dorje has mentioned four monasteries in this region that have been affected, and has called for the repatriation of those monasteries to the Drukpa Kagyu. Witness statements have been posted on social media and documentations provided by the local Buddhist association have proven that the monasteries were Drukpa until at least 2006.

References

Further reading

External links

Homepage of  Gyalwang Drukpa

 
Religious leadership roles
Tibetan Buddhist titles